Trophomera is a genus of nematodes belonging to the family Benthimermithidae.

The genus has cosmopolitan distribution.

Species:

Trophomera abyssalis 
Trophomera acuticauda 
Trophomera americana 
Trophomera aptera 
Trophomera arnaudi 
Trophomera australis 
Trophomera bathycola 
Trophomera breviptera 
Trophomera conchicola 
Trophomera conicauda 
Trophomera crozetensis 
Trophomera diploptera 
Trophomera edouardensis 
Trophomera elegantis 
Trophomera filiformis 
Trophomera fodinae 
Trophomera gracilis 
Trophomera granovitchi 
Trophomera hopei 
Trophomera hureaui 
Trophomera ifremeri 
Trophomera improvisa 
Trophomera iturupiensis 
Trophomera laubieri 
Trophomera leptosoma 
Trophomera litoralis 
Trophomera longiovaris 
Trophomera mangani 
Trophomera marionensis 
Trophomera megala 
Trophomera minuta 
Trophomera minutissima 
Trophomera pacifica 
Trophomera petterae 
Trophomera platyptera 
Trophomera pseudominuta 
Trophomera regalis 
Trophomera rosaliae 
Trophomera rotundicauda 
Trophomera senckenbergi 
Trophomera tchesunovi 
Trophomera turpicauda

References

Nematodes